Hot Metal (1986–88) is a British sitcom produced by London Weekend Television about the newspaper industry.

Written by David Renwick and Andrew Marshall, it is very much a continuation in style from their previous sitcom Whoops Apocalypse!. It was produced by Humphrey Barclay.

Synopsis
The Daily Crucible, the dullest newspaper in Fleet Street, is suddenly taken over by media magnate Terence "Twiggy" Rathbone (Robert Hardy) (an obvious parody of real-life magnates, especially Rupert Murdoch and Robert Maxwell). Its editor Harry Stringer (Geoffrey Palmer) is 'promoted' to managing editor, and is replaced in his old job by Russell Spam (also played by Hardy). At first Stringer is convinced that Spam is in fact Rathbone in disguise, until he sees the two of them together (via split-screen). In a later episode Stringer meets the paper's board of directors, all of whom are also played by Hardy.

Spam takes the paper shooting downmarket and turns the Crucible into a sensation-seeking scandal rag, very much in the style of the British tabloids of the 1980s, in particular The Sun and The Daily Mirror. In one episode, the Crucible's Page 3 is spiced up by the invention of "Wobblevision", a method of animating nude glamour photos by means of special printing techniques and 3D-style glasses with moving filters. This idea has to be dropped due to medical evidence that it causes migraines and vision problems; following this revelation Stringer tells a user, "stop it, you'll go blind".

Spam is helped in his popularising campaign by his ace gutter journalist, Greg Kettle (Richard Kane), who intimidates his tabloid victims by claiming to be "a representative of Her Majesty's press" and produces stories such as accusing a vicar of being a werewolf. Throughout the first series, a running plot involved cub reporter Bill Tytla (John Gordon Sinclair) gradually uncovering an actual newsworthy story that went to the very heart of government (Tytla appears to be named after animator Vladimir "Bill" Tytla).

In the second series, Harry Stringer had vanished in a "mysterious aircraft accident", to be replaced as Managing Editor by former daytime chat show host Richard Lipton (Richard Wilson). The cub reporter investigating the running plot this time was Maggie Troon (Caroline Milmoe).

The show's opening title sequence depicts the titles apparently being printed by metal type blocks; in the closing titles, blocks spelling the main title are seen melting in time-lapse behind the credits.

Cast
 Robert Hardy as Russell Spam, Terrence "Twiggy" Rathbone and Daily Crucible board members
 Richard Kane as Greg Kettle
 Geoffrey Palmer as Harold Stringer (series 1)
 John Gordon Sinclair as Bill Tytla (series 1)
 Geoffrey Hutchings as Max Rutherford (series 1)
 John Horsley as Father Teasdale (series 1)
 Sarah Mortimer as Sharon Chandler (series 1)
 Richard Wilson as Richard "Dicky" Lipton (series 2)
 Caroline Milmoe as Maggie Troon (series 2)
 David Barrass as Jack Thrush (series 2)

Episode list
In total, twelve episodes were made and broadcast. A Comic Relief special episode was also broadcast.

Series 1
{| class="wikitable plainrowheaders" style="width:70%; background:#FFFFFF;"
|-
!style="background:#cccccc;"|#
!style="background:#cccccc;"|Title
!style="background:#cccccc;"|Original air date

|}

Series 2
{| class="wikitable plainrowheaders" style="width:70%; background:#FFFFFF;"
|-
!style="background:#ACE5EE;"|#
!style="background:#ACE5EE;"|Title
!style="background:#ACE5EE;"|Original air date

|}

Comic Relief special
In 1989 the show was briefly revived for a 13-minute Comic Relief special "The Satellite Years" (AKA "The Rat Sat on the Cat"), with Hardy and Palmer reviving their roles from the first series (though the second series set was used).

{| class="wikitable plainrowheaders" style="width:70%; background:#FFFFFF;"
|-
!style="background:#FF5F64;"|#
!style="background:#FF5F64;"|Title
!style="background:#FF5F64;"|Original air date

|}

DVD and streaming release
Both series of Hot Metal have been released on DVD. A 2-disc set of the complete series has also been released. In March 2022 the series was added to UK streaming service BritBox.

References

External links
.
.
Hot metal at BBC online comedy guide.
.

ITV sitcoms
1986 British television series debuts
1989 British television series endings
1980s British sitcoms
English-language television shows
London Weekend Television shows
Television series by ITV Studios